State Route 214 (SR 214) is a  two-lane east-to-west state highway located in Obion County in the U.S. state of Tennessee. Locally, this road is known as the Ken Tenn Highway.

Route description
SR 214 begins at an intersection with US 45W, SR 22, and SR 184 in Union City. The SR 22 freeway goes north and south. US 45W comes in from the west and goes north with SR 22. SR 214 continues east from here traveling south of the US 51/US 45W/SR 3 freeway alignment as a two-lane highway through farmland. The old alignment (SR 214) merges with the new alignment on the west side of South Fulton, just west of an interchange with US 45E/SR 215.

History

SR 214 is the former alignment of U.S. Route 51 (US 51) between Union City and South Fulton before the existing freeway alignment was constructed slightly to the north.

Major intersections

References

215
Transportation in Obion County, Tennessee
Interstate 69